Island is a novel by Jane Rogers, first published in 1999. It is a contemporary novel set on an isolated Scottish island, partly inspired by Shakespeare's The Tempest. It uses folk tales and short episodes of brutal psychological realism to describe the mental transformation of an angry young woman.

The novel has been adapted for the film Island, which was released in 2011.

Plot summary
Nikki Black, a disturbed and hate-filled young woman intent on punishing the mother who abandoned her at birth goes to the island with only one aim in mind: revenge. Her plans are confounded by the discovery that she has a brother, Calum: a brother strangely possessed by their mother; a brother with a terrifyingly violent streak; a brother whose dangerous love and strange way of seeing the world transform Nikki's life. The characters Calum and Phyllis are loosely based upon Caliban and Prospero.

Publication history
 1999, first published in Great Britain by Little, Brown and Company
 2000, first paperback edition, published by Abacus
 2007, republished
 2008, reprinted:

References

External links
 The Island at janerogers.org

1999 British novels
Novels based on The Tempest
Novels set in Scotland
Little, Brown and Company books
Novels set on islands
British novels adapted into films